Burton–Judson Courts (BJ) is a dormitory located on the University of Chicago campus. The neo-Gothic style structure was designed by the Philadelphia architectural firm of Zantzinger, Borie & Medary, and was completed in 1931 at a cost of $1,756,287.

Burton–Judson Courts is built around two courtyards that are named after the university's second and third presidents, Harry Pratt Judson and Ernest DeWitt Burton. Burton-Judson contains six houses: Chamberlin, Coulter, Dodd-Mead, Linn-Mathews, Salisbury, and Vincent. 
In addition to student rooms, the building contains a library, lounge rooms, and apartments for resident heads and the resident deans.

Notable residents
Otis Brawley, oncologist and executive vice president of the American Cancer Society.
Misha Collins, actor.
James W. Cronin, Ok Nobel Prize–winning physicist and University of Chicago faculty member. Lived in Vincent House (room 415).
Philip Glass, Noted composer, lived in Coulter House.
Tucker Max, Noted blogger and "fratire" writer. Lived in Mathews House.
Walter Oi, academic and US government economist.
Ken Ono, mathematician. Lived in Dodd-Mead House.
Santa J. Ono, Immunologist, 15th President of University of Michigan and 28th President of University of Cincinnati, 15th President of University of British Columbia. Lived in Dodd-Mead House (room 141a).
Richard Rorty, American Pragmatist.
Carl Sagan, Noted astronomer. Lived in Dodd House (room 141). 
Bernie Sanders, United States Senator from Vermont. Lived in Chamberlin House.
Thomas Sebeok, semiotician and linguist.
Evan Sharp, Co-founder and designer of Pinterest. Lived in Salisbury House.
George Steiner, Literary and cultural critic.
Nate Silver, Statistician and editor-in-chief of FiveThirtyEight. Lived in Vincent House.
Morgan Saylor, Actress. Lived in Dodd-Mead House.

See also
 Housing at the University of Chicago

References

External links
 
Guide to the University of Chicago Burton-Judson Courts Records 1929-2007 at the University of Chicago Special Collections Research Center

Residence halls of the University of Chicago
University and college dormitories in the United States
University of Chicago